Tachosa acronyctoides is a moth of the family Erebidae.

Distribution
It is found in most countries of Africa, from Guinea and Ethiopia south until South Africa.

References

Moths described in 1869
Tachosa
Moths of Africa